This is a list of Brazilian television related events from 2015.

Events
7 April - Cézar Lima wins the fifteenth season of Big Brother Brasil.
6 December - Actress Viviane Araújo and her partner Marcelo Grangeiro win the twelfth season of Dança dos Famosos.
25 December - Renato Vianna wins the fourth season of The Voice Brasil.

Debuts

Television shows

1970s
Vila Sésamo (1972-1977, 2007–present)
Turma da Mônica (1976–present)

1990s
Malhação (1995–present)
Cocoricó (1996–present)

2000s
Big Brother Brasil (2002–present)
Dança dos Famosos (2005–present)
Peixonauta (2009–present)

2010s
Meu Amigãozão (2010–present)
Sítio do Picapau Amarelo (2012-2016)
The Voice Brasil (2012–present)
Historietas Assombradas (para Crianças Malcriadas) (2013–present)
O Show da Luna (2014–present)
Irmão do Jorel (2014–present)
The Noite com Danilo Gentili (2014–present)
Mundo Disney (2015–present)
Mister Brau (2015–present)

Ending this year
 Programa da Tarde (2012-2015), Rede Record
 Agora é Tarde (2011-2015), Rede Bandeirantes
 Ichiban (2014-2015), PlayTV
 Go!Game (2011-2015), PlayTV
 Notícias da Manhã (2014-2015), SBT
 Muito Show (2013-2015), RedeTV
 Vitória (2014-2015), Rede Record
 TV Globinho (2000-2015), Rede Globo
 Interferência Stay Heavy (2012-2015), PlayTV
 Provocações (2000-2015), TV Cultura SP

Births

Deaths

See also
2015 in Brazil
List of Brazilian films of 2015

References